The Great St. Louis Bank Robbery (also called The St. Louis Bank Robbery, the film title in the opening credits) is a 1959 heist film, directed by Charles Guggenheim and starring Steve McQueen as a college dropout hired to be the getaway driver in a bank robbery.

Based on a 1953 bank robbery attempt of Southwest Bank in St. Louis, the film was shot on location in 1958. It featured some of the men and women from the St. Louis Police Department, as well as local residents and bank employees, re-enacting their roles during the actual robbery attempt. Steve McQueen was an unknown actor when filming began. Later in 1958 he had a breakout role as Josh Randall in the TV series Wanted Dead or Alive and gained national recognition.

Plot

Aging criminal mastermind John Egan decides to rob St. Louis' Southwest Bank, then use the loot to retire to Mexico with his longtime minion Willy. Their accomplice, Gino, is an ex-convict terrified of returning to prison, and wants money to pay for his defense in an upcoming criminal trial. The gang needs a driver for the getaway car. Gino recruits his sister Ann's old boyfriend, George Fowler, a former collegiate football star with no criminal history. Egan takes a liking to George, much to Willy's displeasure.

The gang meticulously gathers information on the bank to help Egan draw up his plans. In order to pay for a hotel room, Gino convinces George to borrow money from Ann. The transaction is the first meeting between the young couple since an unspecified action by George got them both expelled from college. George and Gino keep the incident hidden from Egan, who refuses to have women even tangentially involved in his work; he drunkenly confesses to George that his misogyny comes from experiences with his abusive mother, whom he eventually murdered by pushing her down a flight of stairs.

Ann sees George and Gino watching the bank, and deduces that they are planning a robbery. She confronts George, who claims that he will use the money to return to school and straighten out his life. Ann still feels too much affection for George to notify the police, but she goes to the Southwest Bank at night and writes a warning about the impending robbery on its window. Willy saw George and Ann together, enabling Egan to trace the source of the message. The gang invades Ann's apartment, with Egan demanding that she leave town until the heist has been completed. Both Gino and George fail to stand up for Ann, letting Egan and Willy carry her away. As the three leave the apartment building, Egan has a flashback to his mother's murder and throws Ann to her death off the fire escape.

Feeling personally betrayed by George, Egan orders him to participate directly in the robbery while Willy drives the car. They neglected to bring a police-frequency scanner and are unaware that the bank had relocated a switchboard from the lobby, elements that foil key aspects of their plan. An employee triggers the silent alarm, and police swarm the bank exterior. Willy flees in the car, leaving the other robbers stranded. As the gang try to work out their next move, Egan inadvertently reveals that he killed Ann. He forces his way out of the bank, using a teller as a human shield, but is shot down by the police. Gino commits suicide in the basement vault.

George takes a young woman hostage. Her husband tries to intervene, and the woman warns him that George is a vicious criminal who will show them no mercy. Already shaken by Ann's death, George breaks down and begins protesting that he is not really a criminal. He releases the woman and lets himself be captured by the police. Driven away in a paddy wagon, he sees the world receding behind metal bars.

Cast
 Steve McQueen as George Fowler
 Crahan Denton as John Egan, the gang boss
 David Clarke as Gino, Ann's brother
 James Dukas as Willy, the driver
 Molly McCarthy as Ann, George's ex-girlfriend and Gino's sister 
 Martha Gable as Eddie's wife
 Larry Gerst as Eddie

Reception

See also
 Fred William Bowerman, the actual leader of the robbery gang (and figure for character John Egan)

References

External links

 
 
 

1959 films
1959 crime drama films
1950s heist films
American black-and-white films
American crime drama films
American heist films
Crime films based on actual events
Films about bank robbery
Films directed by Charles Guggenheim
Films scored by Bernardo Segall
Films set in Missouri
Films set in St. Louis
Films shot in Missouri
United Artists films
Articles containing video clips
Films shot in St. Louis
1950s English-language films
1950s American films